The North Dakota Winter Show is an agriculture and livestock show held in Valley City, North Dakota the first full week of every March. The Winter Show started in 1937 and now has an annual attendance of around 30,000 people.

North Dakota's oldest agriculture show, the show was founded under the guidance of Valley City businessman Herman Stern, who had previously been instrumental in the founding of the Greater North Dakota Association in 1924-25, and was serving as president of that group in 1937 when the state was facing adverse economic and agricultural circumstances. Another GNDA official, Bert Groom, proposed establishing the Winter Show to attract visitors and commerce, and the event was established.  Stern later received North Dakota's highest citizen honor, the Rough Rider Award, in honor of this and other accomplishments. There was no show in 1942.

In 2004 the Winter Show's traditional ten-day schedule was compressed to six days while retaining the full schedule of activities.

Since 2021, strict measures are undertaken, such as wearing masks & social distancing.

Events
 North Dakota Winter Show
 North Star Classic
 Concerts
 Livestock shows
 PRCA rodeo
 State crop show
 4-H and FFA livestock judging
 4-H and FFA crop judging
 Special events
 Livestock sales

References

External links

 North Dakota Winter Show website
 North Dakota Tourism website

Festivals in North Dakota
Agricultural shows in the United States
Tourist attractions in Barnes County, North Dakota
Festivals established in 1937
1937 establishments in North Dakota